Twinhills Woods and Meadows is a 21.2 hectare (52.4 acre) biological Site of Special Scientific Interest on the Monarch's Way south of Dulcote in Somerset, notified in 1990.

Twinhills Woods and Meadows comprise a complex of ancient, semi-natural woodland, neutral and calcareous grassland with associated mature hedges and areas of shrub growth. Further interest is added by the presence of numerous butterfly species on the site. A total of 26 species have been recorded including grizzled skipper (Pyrgus malvae), white-letter hairstreak (Satyrium w-album), green-veined white (Pieris napi), brown argus (Aricia agestis), marbled white (Melangargia galthea), silver-washed fritillary (Argynnis paphia) and marsh fritillary (Eurodryas aurinia).

The site is crossed by the Monarch's Way long distance footpath.

References 

Sites of Special Scientific Interest in Somerset
Sites of Special Scientific Interest notified in 1990
Woodland Sites of Special Scientific Interest
Forests and woodlands of Somerset
Meadows in Somerset